Salvio is a surname. Notable people with the surname include:

Alessandro Salvio ( 1570– 1640), Italian chess player
Eduardo Salvio (born 1990), Argentine footballer

See also
Nicole Di Salvio (born 1979), Italian softball player
Salvo (surname)